Royce Hunt (born 13 August 1995) is a Samoa international rugby league footballer who plays as a  for the Cronulla-Sutherland Sharks in the NRL.  

Hunt previously played for the Canberra Raiders in the National Rugby League.

Early life
Hunt was born in Liverpool, Sydney NSW and is of Samoan, Hawaiian and Maori descent. He was educated at Kalgoorlie State High School.

Hunt played his junior rugby league for the Willagee Bears and Goldfields Titans in the Western Australia Rugby League, before being signed by the Canterbury-Bankstown Bulldogs.

Arriving at Canterbury-Bankstown Bulldogs, Hunt attended Bass High School and represented the 2013 Australian Schoolboys.

Playing career

Early career
In 2014 and 2015, Hunt played for the Canterbury-Bankstown Bulldogs' NYC team. In 2016, he joined the Mount Pritchard Mounties in the Intrust Super Premiership NSW. After impressing for the Mounties, he gained a contract with the Canberra Raiders for 2017.

2017
In round 14 of the 2017 NRL season, Hunt made his NRL debut for Canberra against the Penrith Panthers.

2018
Hunt made no first grade appearances for Canberra in the 2018 NRL season instead playing for Mounties in the Canterbury Cup NSW competition.

2019
Hunt made no appearances for Canberra in the 2019 NRL season.  Hunt instead played against for Mounties in the Canterbury Cup NSW competition as they qualified for the finals finishing in 6th place.  Hunt played in Mounties elimination final loss against Newtown at Campbelltown Stadium.

On 13 October, it was announced that Hunt had been released by Canberra.

2020
In early 2020, Hunt signed a contract to join Cronulla-Sutherland for the 2020 NRL season.

In round 8 of the 2020 NRL season, Hunt scored his first try for Cronulla-Sutherland and his first in the top grade as Cronulla defeated the Gold Coast 40-10 at Cbus Super Stadium.

In round 19 against the Sydney Roosters, Hunt was taken from the field during the second half of the game with a leg injury.  It was later revealed Hunt had dislocated his right kneecap.

2021
Hunt played only two games for Cronulla in the 2021 NRL season which saw the club narrowly miss the finals by finishing 9th on the table.

2022
Hunt played a total of 19 games for Cronulla in the 2022 NRL season as the club finished second on the table.  Hunt played in Cronulla's qualifying final loss to North Queensland but did not feature in Cronulla's elimination semi-final loss to South Sydney.

In October Hunt was named in the Samoa squad for the 2021 Rugby League World Cup.
Hunt played for Samoa in their 2021 Rugby League World Cup final loss to Australia.

2023
In round 3 of the 2023 NRL season, Hunt was sent to the sin bin during Cronulla's 24-20 loss against Canberra for punching Corey Horsburgh.

Statistics

NRL
 Statistics are correct as of the end of the 2022 season

All Star

International

References

External links

Cronulla Sharks profile
Canberra Raiders profile
Samoa profile

1995 births
Living people
Australian rugby league players
Australian sportspeople of Samoan descent
Canberra Raiders players
Cronulla-Sutherland Sharks players
Mount Pritchard Mounties players
Rugby league props
Rugby league second-rows
Rugby league locks
People from Kalgoorlie
Rugby league players from Sydney
Samoa national rugby league team players